The  was a fleet of the Imperial Japanese Navy during World War II, primarily responsible for control of the Tsushima Strait.

History
The IJN 7th Fleet was formed on 15 April 1945, during the closing stages of World War II. It was essentially an administrative fleet tasked with coordinating local defenses and control of the sea lanes between northern Kyūshū and far western Honshū, and the Korean peninsula. It was headquartered at Moji-ku, Kitakyūshū. The “fleet” was assigned an old minelayer, converted merchant vessels and a small number of anti-submarine patrol boats, so that its actual combat potential was almost nonexistent. It was disbanded at the end of World War II.

The commander of the IJN 7th Fleet concurrently held the post of commander in chief of the 1st Escort Fleet.

Commanders of the IJN 7th Fleet

Notes

References

7
Military units and formations established in 1945
Military units and formations disestablished in 1945